Syncrotaulella is a genus of moths of the family Yponomeutidae.

Species
Syncrotaulella strepsicentra - Meyrick, 1937 

Yponomeutidae